A Season of Love Tour is a concert tour by actress and singer Idina Menzel in support of her second holiday album Christmas: A Season of Love. The tour is only performed in 3 cities on the East Coast of the United States.

Background
On October 7, 2019, Menzel announced that she would perform a one night only concert at New York City's Carnegie Hall on December 11, 2019. The announcement came following the most prior announcement about her seventh studio album and second holiday album Christmas: A Season of Love. On October 9, 2019, Menzel announced two additional shows set for December 6, 2019 at Caesars Atlantic City in Atlantic City, NJ and December 8, 2019, at the Grand Theatre at Foxwoods Resort Casino in Mashantucket, CT.

Synopsis
Menzel performs a selection of holiday favorites from holiday album Christmas: A Season of Love. In addition, Menzel performs selections from her breakout performances on Broadway in Wicked and Rent along with her Oscar-winning song Let It Go from Disney's Frozen.

Special Guests
Ron Fair (Conductor at all shows)
Aaron Lohr (at all shows)
Kristen Anderson-Lopez (at the New York City show only)
Marlow Rosado (at the New York City show only)
Billy Porter (at the New York City show only)
The Girls from Menzel's A Broaderway Foundation Camp (at the New York City show only)

Setlist
"Sleigh Ride" from Christmas: A Season of Love
"The Most Wonderful Time of the Year" from Christmas: A Season Of Love
"We Need a Little Christmas" from Christmas: A Season Of Love / Mame
"Do You Want to Build a Snowman?" from Frozen
"A Hand For Mrs. Claus" from Christmas: A Season Of Love
"I'll Be Home For Christmas" (duet with Aaron Lohr) from Christmas: A Season Of Love
"Ocho Kandelikas" from Christmas: A Season Of Love
"Defying Gravity" from Wicked
"Christmas Time Is Here" from Christmas: A Season Of Love
"O Holy Night"/"Ave Maria" from Christmas: A Season Of Love
"We Wish You The Merriest" from Christmas: A Season Of Love
"Christmas Just Ain't Christmas" from Christmas: A Season Of Love
"Let It Go" from Frozen
"I Got My Love to Keep Me Warm" from Christmas: A Season Of Love
"At This Table" from Christmas: A Season Of Love
"Into The Unknown" from Frozen 2

Encores
"Seasons of Love" from Christmas: A Season Of Love / Rent
"Auld Lang Syne" from Christmas: A Season Of Love

Tour dates

References

2019 concert tours
Idina Menzel concert tours